Sitara Brooj Akbar is a Pakistani youth representative. She gave speeches and orations to large crowds and on national television at the age of five.  She passed  her O Levels in five subjects at the age of 11. She completed her A Levels at age 13. Akbar was also permitted by the British Council to undertake the International English Language Testing System (IELTS) test in 2011, and achieved a score of 7 bands at age 11.

Recognition
Some of her achievements are as below:
 Gold Medal Awarded by the President of Pakistan
 Talented Children's Award awarded by the Prime Minister of Pakistan
 Country of Kalamar, Sweden Award
 Outstanding Pakistani Award from the Nazaria Pakistan Council
 Honorary Shield of Appreciation from Pakistan's Ambassador to UAE
 Certificates of appreciation by British Council
 Active Citizens Award by British Council
 Meri Pehchan Pakistan Award by Pakistan Association, Dubai
 Certificate from Parliamentary Forum on Child Rights

Personal life
Akbar was born on 10 February 2000 in the small town of Rabwah in Punjab, Pakistan is the eldest of 5 siblings and belongs to the Ahmadiyya Muslim Community. She is serving as the youth ambassador for Pakistan Association Dubai. and is a student. She is interested in research, community work and international relations.

References

Punjabi people
Pakistani Ahmadis
2000 births
Living people
People from Rabwah
Pakistani children